Peace is an album recorded by composer and vibraphonist Walt Dickerson in 1975 for the SteepleChase label.

Reception

Allmusic gave the album 3 stars.

Track listing
All compositions by Walt Dickerson.
 "Universal Peace" – 17:47		
 "Chant of Peace" – 28:10		
 "Warm Up" – 3:18 Bonus track on CD reissue

Personnel 
Walt Dickerson – vibraphone
Lisle Atkinson – bass
Andrew Cyrille – drums

References 

1976 albums
Walt Dickerson albums
SteepleChase Records albums